Lady Laura may refer to:

"Lady Laura", a song by Roberto Carlos
Lady Laura Teresa Alma-Tadema (1852–1909), English painter
Lady Laura Troubridge (1867–1946), British novelist

See also
Lady Lara, a 2015 yacht
Laura (disambiguation)